2020s in electoral politics refers to events and outcomes from elections all around the world, during the decade of the 2020s.

Africa

Benin 
Presidential elections were held in Benin on 11 April 2021 to elect the President of the Republic of Benin for a five-year term. Incumbent president Patrice Talon was re-elected for a second term in office with 86% of the vote.

Burkina Faso 
General elections were held in Burkina Faso on 22 November 2020 to elect the President and National Assembly. In the presidential elections, incumbent president Roch Marc Christian Kaboré of the People's Movement for Progress was re-elected in the first round with 57.9% of the vote, avoiding the need for second round. The main campaign focus of the major presidential candidates was the growing insecurity in the country with the rise in terrorism and ethnic violence.

Burundi 
General elections were held in Burundi on 20 May 2020 to elect both the president and the National Assembly. Évariste Ndayishimiye of the ruling CNDD–FDD was elected president with 71% of the vote. In the National Assembly elections, the CNDD–FDD won 72 of the 100 elected seats. The Conference of Bishops of Burundi issued a statement criticizing the transparency and freedom of the election process. The church deployed around 2,716 observers across Burundi's 119 municipalities. The conference's observers witnessed intimidation and expulsion of opposition observers from the polling and vote counting stations. The church condemned the ruling party for engaging in national election fraud. The East African Community issued a statement saying that "The 2020 Burundi elections hold an iconic place in the history of the nation, marking this the first peaceful and democratic transfer of power. More significantly, the process was domestically driven through own funding. The peaceful conclusion of the electoral process will not only be a big win for the people of Burundi, but for the East African Community as a region."

Cameroon 
Parliamentary elections were held in Cameroon on 9 February 2020. The Cameroon People's Democratic Movement retained its majority in parliament, winning 139 of the 167 seats decided on election day. The ongoing Anglophone Crisis dominated the process, with supporters of Ambazonia calling for a boycott of the election. Ensuing violence resulted in a low turnout in the Northwest Region and Southwest Region, with separatists claiming that 98 percent of eligible voters had boycotted the election.

Cape Verde 
Parliamentary elections were held in Cape Verde on 18 April 2021. The current prime minister, Ulisses Correia e Silva of the Christian democrat Movement for Democracy (MpD) party, won re-election after five years of government. His main contender was Janira Hopffer Almada, of the moderate socialist African Party for the Independence of Cape Verde (PAICV). The two parties have been the dominant political forces in Cape Verde since its democratization, but several new parties were taking part in the election.

Comoros 
Legislative elections were held in the Comoros on 19 January 2020; in constituencies where no candidate received a majority, a second round was held alongside local elections on 23 February. The elections were boycotted by the main opposition parties, including the two largest parties in the outgoing parliament, the Union for the Development of the Comoros and Juwa Party, in protest at constitutional reform and political repression, The result was a landslide victory for President Azali Assoumani's Convention for the Renewal of the Comoros, which won 20 of the 24 elected seats.

Cote d’Ivoire 
Presidential elections were held in Ivory Coast on 31 October 2020. The election, boycotted by the opposition, saw the reelection of incumbent Alassane Ouattara. Several people were killed in clashes in Toumodi, as well as Tiébissou.

Djibouti 
Presidential elections were held in Djibouti on 9 April 2021. Incumbent president Ismaïl Omar Guelleh was re-elected for his fifth five-year term, having served in the role since 1999.

Ghana 
General elections were held in Ghana on 7 December 2020. Incumbent President Nana Akufo-Addo of the New Patriotic Party (NPP) was re-elected in the first round after securing a majority of the votes. Former President John Dramani Mahama said he would contest the results.

Guinea 
Parliamentary elections were held in Guinea on 22 March 2020 alongside a constitutional referendum, after being postponed four times from the original date of January 2019. The 2020 Guinean presidential election resulted in a third term for President Alpha Condé, with protests against him resulting in at least 30 deaths according to the opposition.

Mali 
Parliamentary elections were held in Mali on 29 March 2020, with a second round on 19 April. They were initially scheduled to be held on 25 November and 16 December 2018, but were moved to April 2019 and then to June 2019, before being postponed until 2020 by the Council of Ministers. The elections were marred by violence in the north and center of the country.

Incidents on April 19 prevented some people from casting votes, and on 30 April the Constitutional Court overturned the results in 31 districts, giving Rally for Mali, which is led by President Ibrahim Boubacar Keïta, ten more seats than originally expected. Opposition parties led by Iman Mahmoud Dicko established the Mouvement du 5 juin - Rassemblement des forces patriotiques  (June 5 Movement - Rally of Patriotic Forces) on 30 May, and thousands took to the streets in protest on 5 June.

Boubou Cisse was reappointed Prime Minister on 11 June, when he was instructed to form a new government. Tens of thousands of Malians protested again on 19 June, demanding the resignation of President Keïta. On June 20, the Economic Community of West African States (ECOWAS) called for new elections to be held.

President Ibrahim Boubacar Keïta and Imam Mahmoud Dicko met on 5 July, but the opposition continued to call for civil disobedience to force Keïta's resignation and the dissolution of Parliament. Protests turned violent on 10 July. For the next three days, protesters in Bamako clashed with security forces, and security forces reportedly fired live rounds at the protesters, killing at least 11 and injuring 124.

Nigeria

Seychelles 
General elections were held in Seychelles on 22–24 October 2020 to elect the President and members of the National Assembly. The National Assembly elections had been due in 2021, but in July 2020 were brought forward by President Danny Faure in order to hold them together with the presidential elections, a proposal supported by opposition parties.

The presidential elections were won by Wavel Ramkalawan of the Linyon Demokratik Seselwa (LDS), with the LDS also increasing its majority in the National Assembly, winning 25 of the 35 seats.

Somalia

Tanzania 
General elections were held in Tanzania on 28 October 2020 to elect the President and National Assembly. The presidential election was won by incumbent John Magufuli of the Chama Cha Mapinduzi party. On 24 October 2020 the opposition claimed that the government was interfering in the election by making it more difficult to accredit thousands of opposition electoral observers, whose job is to ensure that the election is fair. The opposition has also claimed that the National Electoral Commission, whose members are appointed by the president, have barred the challenger Lissu from campaigning while letting the incumbent Magufuli campaign. From 27 October, the Tanzania Communication Regulatory Authority (TCRA) blocked several popular social media websites to restrict communication amid violence in the islands of Zanzibar, where dozens have been shot dead and tens have been injured by the police and other security forces. Tanzania electoral watch panel, USA State Department, Commonwealth, and European Union were very critical about the elections.

Togo 
Presidential elections were held in Togo on 22 February 2020. Incumbent president Faure Gnassingbé of the Union for the Republic (UPR) was re-elected for his fourth term with 71% of the vote in the first round. His closest challenger was Agbéyomé Kodjo, a former prime minister and leader of the newly established Patriotic Movement for Democracy and Development, who received 19% of the vote.

After observing the elections, ECOWAS determined that they were free and transparent, commending the population for its peaceful participation as an improvement from protests years prior against the long reign of the Gnassingbe family. However, sporadic internet shutdowns were recorded across the capital and other major cities, prompting both international watchdogs and opposition parties to question the results.

On 25 February Kodjo filed a petition at the Constitutional Court asking it to overturn the results. Three days later, he and Kpodzro called for public protests, resulting in the military surrounding their homes and the Ministry of Territorial Administration stating that protests would be illegal. Members of the National Assembly responded by accusing Kodjo of planning a coup.

Asia

Azerbaijan 
Parliamentary elections were held in Azerbaijan on 9 February 2020. They were originally scheduled to take place in November 2020, but were brought forward after parliament was dissolved in December 2019. Opposition parties accused President Ilham Aliyev of limiting their ability to campaign, and called for a boycott of the election. The ruling New Azerbaijan Party retained its majority, winning 72 of the 125 seats, although this was later reduced to 70 when results in two constituencies were annulled. The second largest party (the Civic Solidarity Party) won only three seats.

China
On 23 October 2022, Xi Jinping is elected as General Secretary of the Chinese Communist Party by the Central Committee, beginning a third term of the paramount leader of China.

India

Japan
On 29 September 2021, Fumio Kishida defeated Taro Kono in a runoff vote to become the leader of the ruling Liberal Democratic Party (LDP) and replaced outgoing party leader Yoshihide Suga. He received a total of 257 votes, from 249 parliament members and eight rank-and-file members, to become Japan's next Prime Minister. Kishida's Cabinet, which took office on 4 October 2021, consists of 21 members, including 13 who joined the Cabinet for the first time while also including 2 veterans, Toshimitsu Motegi and Nobuo Kishi who retained their respective posts from the previous cabinet under Suga. Kishida announced he would call a general election for 31 October 2021.

Mongolia
Parliamentary elections were held in Mongolia on 24 June 2020. The result was a victory for the ruling Mongolian People's Party, which won 62 of the 76 seats, a slight decrease from the 65 won in the 2016 elections. The Prime Minister Ukhnaagiin Khürelsükh resigned on 27 January 2021 following a minor protest against the mistreatment of a hospital patient.

Myanmar 
General elections were held in Myanmar on 8 November 2020, in which the National League for Democracy won 396 out of 476 seats in parliament, while the military's proxy party, the Union Solidarity and Development Party, won only 33 seats. In the 2021 Myanmar coup d'état, democratically elected members of the ruling National League for Democracy were detained and/or deposed from their offices by the Tatmadaw; Myanmar's military.

North Korea 
At the 8th Congress of the Workers' Party of Korea, Kim Jong-un was elected as the General Secretary of the ruling Workers' Party of Korea, inheriting the title from his late father Kim Jong-il, who died in 2011.

South Korea 
South Korea's 21st legislative elections were held on 15 April 2020. All 300 members of the National Assembly were elected, 253 from first-past-the-post constituencies and 47 from proportional party lists. They were the first elections held under the new electoral system. The two largest parties, the liberal Democratic Party and the conservative United Future Party, set up new satellite parties (also known as bloc parties) to take advantage of the revised electoral system. The reforms also lowered the voting age from 19 to 18.

The Democratic Party and its satellite, the Platform Party, won a landslide victory, taking 180 of the 300 seats (60%) between them. The Democratic Party alone won 163 seats — the highest number by any party since 1960. This guarantees the ruling liberal alliance an absolute majority in the legislative chamber, and the three-fifths super-majority required to fast-track its procedures. The conservative alliance between the United Future Party and its satellite Future Korea Party won only 103 seats, the worst conservative result since 1960.

Sri Lanka 
Parliamentary elections in Sri Lanka were held on 5 August 2020 to elect 225 members to Sri Lanka's 16th Parliament. The incumbent Sri Lanka People's Freedom Alliance coalition claimed a landslide victory in the election, winning 145 seats, while Samagi Jana Balawegaya won 54 seats, Tamil National Alliance won 10 seats and National People's Power won 3 seats. The main opposition United National Party suffered the worst showing in its history following a split over party leadership, finishing in fourth place with only one seat. The election was postponed at least twice due to a surge in COVID-19 cases in the country, before the date was finalized as 5 August 2020.

Tajikistan 
Parliamentary elections were held in Tajikistan on 1 March 2020. The result was a landslide victory for the ruling People's Democratic Party, which won 47 of the 63 seats. The only opposition party, the Social Democratic Party, received just 0.3% of the vote. The Organization for Security and Co-operation in Europe was critical of the election.

Vietnam 
On 31 January 2021, Nguyễn Phú Trọng is re-elected for a third five-year term as the General Secretary of the Communist Party of Vietnam.

Europe

Albania 
Parliamentary elections were held in Albania on 25 April 2021. The Socialist Party of Albania retained its majority.

Czech Republic

Croatia 
The presidential elections' second round took place on 5 January 2020 between the two candidates with the highest number of votes in the first round. Zoran Milanović won the second round with 52.66% of the vote. The 2020 Croatian parliamentary election took place on 5 July 2020. The ruling HDZ obtained an upset victory over the Restart Coalition, who had previously been leading in opinion polls for several weeks prior to the elections.

Estonia

Greece
Presidential elections were held in Greece on Wednesday 22 January 2020 for the President of the Hellenic Republic. Incumbent President Prokopis Pavlopoulos, who was elected by the Hellenic Parliament on the 18 February 2015, was eligible for re-election but was not suggested by the government. Katerina Sakellaropoulou won the election with 261 votes. She was elected as the 13th and first female President of Greece.

Iceland 
Presidential elections were held in Iceland on 27 June 2020. Absentee voting opened on 25 May 2020. Incumbent president Guðni Th. Jóhannesson was re-elected with 92% of the vote.

Ireland 
The 2020 Irish general election resulted in a historic win for the Sinn Féin, making it the second largest party of the Dáil Éireann. The result was seen as a historic shift in Ireland's political landscape, effectively ending the two-party system of Fine Gael and Fianna Fáil. The reason for the electoral upset for these parties was believed to be in voter dissatisfaction on issues of health, housing and homelessness. Sinn Féin won 37 seats, Fianna Fáil won 38, and Fine Gael won 35. Seán Ó Fearghaíl was re-elected to Ceann Comhairle at the first sitting of the 33rd Dáil on 20 February 2020.

Italy

Moldova 
The 2020 Moldovan presidential election was won by Maia Sandu becoming the first female president and promising reform of the country's corruption. After entering office, she demanded the withdrawal of Russian troops from Transnistria.

North Macedonia 
Early parliamentary elections were held in North Macedonia on 15 July 2020. It was originally scheduled for November 2020, but Prime Minister Zoran Zaev called early elections after the European Council failed to come to an agreement on starting talks with North Macedonia on joining the European Union in October 2019. The election date was set for 12 April, but was postponed until July due to the COVID-19 pandemic in North Macedonia.

Poland 
The 2020 Polish presidential election was completed with a second round of voting on 12 July 2020. The first round of voting was held on 28 June 2020. The incumbent president Andrzej Duda, running with the support of Law and Justice, faced off against Civic Platform vice-chairman and Mayor of Warsaw Rafał Trzaskowski after first round results showed Duda with 43.5% of the vote and Trzaskowski with 30.46%. Results from the second round of voting, announced by the National Electoral Commission (PKW) on 13 July, indicated that Andrzej Duda had won with 51.03% compared to Rafał Trzaskowski's 48.97%.

Portugal

Romania 
The 2020 Romanian legislative election had a record low turnout of 31.84 percent due to the COVID-19 pandemic, with the ruling centre-right coalition winning the election, and the far-right Alliance for the Union of Romanians entering the legislature for the first time boosted by vaccine skepticism.

Serbia 
Parliamentary elections were held in Serbia on 21 June 2020. Initially organised for 26 April 2020, they were postponed by a state of emergency due to the COVID-19 pandemic in the country. In the period before the elections, inter-party European Parliament–mediated dialogue was held and certain changes in election legislation were made. Numerous parliamentary and non-parliamentary political parties boycotted the elections, including the major opposition coalition Alliance for Serbia, which said that there were no conditions for free and fair elections. This resulted in the lowest turnout since the establishment of a multi-party system in 1990. The Serbian Progressive Party–led coalition won one of the largest parliamentary majorities in Europe.

Slovakia 
Parliamentary elections were held in Slovakia on 29 February 2020 to elect all 150 members of the National Council. The anti-corruption movement Ordinary People (OĽaNO) led by Igor Matovič emerged as the largest party, winning 53 seats. The ruling coalition comprising Direction – Social Democracy (Smer–SD), the Slovak National Party (SNS) and Most–Híd, led by Prime Minister Peter Pellegrini of Smer–SD, won only 38, with both the SNS and Most–Híd losing their parliamentary representation. It was the first time since the 2006 elections that Smer–SD did not emerge as the party with the most seats. As no party or electoral coalition won a majority of seats, a coalition government was needed. On 13 March, Matovič announced he had reached an agreement for a governing coalition with We Are Family, Freedom and Solidarity and For the People, though they had not agreed upon a common governing program.

North America

United States of America

2020 elections

South America

Bolivia 
The 2020 Bolivian general election was won by the Movement for Socialism, which had been deposed from power during the 2019 Bolivian political crisis.

See also 
 European Union

Notes

References

Bibliography
 

 
2020s decade overviews